Pierre Sudreau (13 May 1919 – 22 January 2012) was a French politician. His childhood correspondence with Antoine de Saint-Exupéry (1900–1944) helped inspire the title character of the 1943 novel The Little Prince.

Biography
Sudreau was born in Paris, the son of businessman Jean Sudreau and Marie-Marguerite (née Boyer) Sudreau.

He announced his resignation as French Education Minister in October 1962 in protest against a proposal by Charles de Gaulle to amend the constitution.

In 1985, Sudreau sat on the "Jury of Honor" that assessed whatever the film Des terroristes à la retraite should be aired in France or not. Sudreau referred to the recent Palestinian bombings of American and Israeli targets and stated: "at the very moment when we are again talking about direct action, this broadcast legitimizes terrorist methods.” The "Jury of Honor" in its report stated “though it is highly desirable that a film inform French of all generations about the saga of the FTP-MOI, such a film nevertheless still remains to be made”.

Personal life
He was married to France Brun; they had three children: Jean Sudreau (predeceased), Anne Sudreau O'Connor (predeceased), and Bernard Sudreau. His son Jean died of lung cancer and was married to Danièle Louis-Dreyfus, daughter of French Resistance fighter and businessman Pierre Louis-Dreyfus.

Publications
 1967 L'enchaînement (Plon)
 1980 La stratégie de l'absurde (Plon)
 1985 De l'inertie politique (éditions Stock)
 1991 Au-delà de toutes les frontières

Bibliography
 Christiane Rimbaud, Pierre Sudreau, Le Cherche Midi, 2004

References

Books

External links
 

 

1919 births
2012 deaths
French Ministers of National Education
Government ministers of France
Deputies of the 3rd National Assembly of the French Fifth Republic
Deputies of the 4th National Assembly of the French Fifth Republic
Deputies of the 5th National Assembly of the French Fifth Republic
Presidents of the Regional Council of Centre-Val de Loire
Members of the Regional Council of Centre-Val de Loire
Politicians from Paris
Union for French Democracy politicians
Deputies of the 6th National Assembly of the French Fifth Republic
French people of the Algerian War
Officiers of the Légion d'honneur